Imperator Nikolai I (: Emperor Nicholas I) was a Russian dreadnought built during World War I for service in the Black Sea. She was designed to counter multiple prospective Ottoman dreadnoughts which had been placed under order by the Ottoman government, since this raised the possibility that the Russian dreadnoughts being built for the Black Sea Fleet could be outclassed. The ship used the same main armament as the preceding , but was larger and more heavily armored. Imperator Nikolai I was launched in 1916, but construction was suspended on 24 October 1917. The Soviets considered completing her in 1923, but later rejected the idea. She was towed to Sevastopol in 1927 and scrapped.

Design and development
Imperator Nikolai I was designed in response to efforts by the Ottoman Empire to acquire modern dreadnoughts from abroad. By late 1913 it appeared that the Turks would be able to muster three dreadnoughts, two of which were armed with  guns, versus the three Russian dreadnoughts of the Imperatritsa Mariya class then building. A modified version of that class would be the quickest to put into service and the preliminary design work began in December of that year, well before she was formally ordered on 12 September 1914. She was a much larger and more heavily armored ship than the earlier ships, but her guns and machinery were virtually identical to those of the Imperatritsa Mariya class to save time.

General characteristics
Imperator Nikolai I was considerably larger than the preceding Imperatritsa Mariya class. High-tensile steel was used throughout the hull with mild steel used only in areas that did not contribute to structural strength. The hull was subdivided by 20 transverse watertight bulkheads. The engine room was divided by two longitudinal bulkheads and a centerline bulkhead divided the condenser compartment. Frahm anti-rolling tanks were fitted on each side to reduce her rolling motion. She had two electrically driven rudders on the centerline, the main rudder abaft the smaller auxiliary rudder.

Propulsion
The machinery of Imperator Nikolai I differed only in small ways from that of her predecessors. The wing propeller shafts were powered by high pressure ahead and astern turbines, while the inboard shafts were powered by low pressure turbines. The forward group of eight boilers were positioned between the first and second turrets while the aft group of twelve boilers lay between the second and third turrets.

Imperator Nikolai I had four Curtiss-AEG main and two auxiliary turbo generators with each driving two dynamos, one each for alternating current and direct current. Each main generator was rated at  while the auxiliaries had a capacity of  each. These powered the complex electrical system that combined alternating current for most equipment with direct current for heavy-load machinery like the turret motors. No diesel generators were provided.

Armament
Her main armament consisted of a dozen 12-inch Pattern 1907 52-caliber guns mounted in four triple turrets distributed the length of the ship. These guns were identical to those used in the Imperatritsa Mariya-class ships, but the turrets were modified to improve the rate of fire. The guns could be depressed to −5° and elevated to 25°. They could be loaded at any angle between −5° and +15°; their rate of fire was supposed to three rounds per minute up to 15° of elevation. The turrets could elevate at 3–4° per second and traverse at a rate of 3.2° per second. 100 rounds per gun were carried at full load.

The secondary armament consisted of twenty  55-caliber Model 1913 guns mounted in casemates. They were arranged in two groups, six guns per side from the forward turret to the rear funnel and the remaining four clustered around the rear turret. Three guns per side were situated to fire ahead as that was the most likely direction of attack by torpedo boats as anticipated by the Naval General Staff. Their rate of fire ranged from five to eight rounds per minute and they were provided with 245 rounds per gun.

The original anti-aircraft armament was going to be four 38-caliber  AA guns mounted on the roofs of the fore and aft turrets, but this was changed during construction to four 37-caliber  of a new design that never entered service. Four underwater  torpedo tubes were also fitted, two on each broadside. Twelve torpedoes were carried for them.

Fire control
The  rangefinders were originally going to be fitted in the conning tower, but this was changed during construction to mounting them in the forward and aft main gun turrets using periscopes in armored hoods on the turret roofs. These would provide data for the central artillery post to calculate and then transmit to the guns for the gun crew to follow. A new, domestically designed, Erikson mechanical computer for the fire-control system was intended to be used.

Protection
Imperator Nikolai I was much more heavily armored than the Imperatritsa Mariya-class ships, as the weight of armor for the former totaled  more than the older ships. The plates were sized to match the frames to provide support for their joints and they were joined together to better distribute the shock of a shell's impact. The upper strake was 100 mm thick and extended up to the middle deck. The aft area between the upper and middle decks was the only unarmored area of the hull and had a  transverse bulkhead to protect the rear turret magazine from shells fired from rear bearings. The forward bulkhead was only  to serve as a splinter bulkhead as it was screened at all angles by side or deck armor. Behind the side armor was a face-hardened inboard longitudinal splinter bulkhead that was 75 mm thick between the middle and lower decks, but decreased to 25 mm between the middle and upper decks. This sloped away from the edge of the lower deck to the lower edge of the armor belt with a thickness of 75 mm.

The main gun turrets had a face and rear 300 mm thick with 200 mm sides and roof. The barbettes were 300 mm thick, but reduced to  when behind other armor. The funnel uptakes were protected by 75 mm of armor, but reduced to 25 mm between the upper and middle decks. Forward of the citadel the upper deck remained 35 mm thick, but aft the armored decks dropped to the level of the top of the waterline belt (the 35 mm deck) while the 63 mm deck was at the lower edge of the belt. Underwater protection was minimal as there was only  watertight bulkhead behind the upwards extension of the double bottom and even this was squeezed out as the hull narrowed towards the end turrets.

Construction

However she was not actually laid down until 28 April 1915 with the intention to launch her in October 1915. The normal building schedule was maintained until early 1915 as the Russians believed that the war would be over soon. However, workers were diverted to more important projects and war production began to interfere with deliveries of material beginning shortly afterwards which delayed her launch until on 18 October 1916. Several proposals were evaluated while she was building to modify her in light of the issues demonstrated by the Imperatritsa Mariya-class in service. They proved to trim badly by the bow and were very wet forward. One proposal was made to fit Imperator Nikolai I with a forecastle deck to improve her seaworthiness. This was rejected, as the additional weight from the forecastle and raising the forward barbette would actually worsen her trim forward. However, a proposal to add a  bulwark forward was accepted. Work on her continued at a slow rate through the February Revolution of 1917, but the unsettled times disrupted her construction and further delayed her. She was renamed  (: Democracy) on 29 April 1917 and she was estimated to be about 60% complete. Industrial unrest and strikes further slowed progress and the provisional government postponed further work on 24 October 1917 until "a more favorable time".

She was captured on 17 March 1918 when Nikolaev was occupied by the Germans and Austrians, but they did nothing with her incomplete hull. On 25 January 1919 she was listed by the Directorate of Ukraine as planned to be completed and included into the navy list by 1920. On 27 January 1919 she was mentioned at Directorate Navy Ministry order at the list for renaming from 1920  – into  (: Union of Ukraine). However none of the short-lived Directorate orders were actually implemented. She remained at Nikolayev throughout the Russian Civil War, of no use to either side. The victorious Soviets finally inspected her in 1923 to see if she was worth completing. Her dilapidated state and obsolescent design caused them to conclude that it was not worth doing and she should be sold for scrap. Efforts were made to sell the hull abroad to raise hard currency, but when these came to nought she was towed to Sevastopol on 28 June 1927 to begin dismantling.

Notes

Footnotes

Bibliography

External links

 Detailed article with drawings and projections 

World War I battleships of Russia
1916 ships